Frank Washington Ballou (February 22, 1879-February 2, 1955) was superintendent of Washington D.C. public schools from 1920 to 1943. Frank W. Ballou High School is named in his honor. He was the first president of the National Association of Directors of Educational Research, the organization that would eventually become the modern American Educational Research Association.

Early life and education 
Dr. Frank W. Ballou was born in Fort Jackson, St. Lawrence County, New York in 1879 to Hiram and Jennie Ballou.

Ballou attended State Normal Training School in Potsdam, New York. He received a Bachelor of Science degree from Teachers College, Columbia University in 1904, a Master of Arts degree from the University of Cincinnati in 1908, and a Doctor of Philosophy from Harvard University in 1914.

Career 

Ballou spent three years as an assistant professor of education and director of school affiliation at the University of Cincinnati. He was a graduate student at student at Harvard University from 1910 to 1911 and lectured in school administration during Harvard's 1911 summer session. From 1911 to 1912 he assisted Professor Paul H. Hanus in his investigation of the New York City Department of Education. He also performed studies of Watertown, Milton, and Reading high schools and Milton public schools. In 1912 he returned to Harvard as a research fellow. In 1914 he was named director of promotions and educational measurement for Boston Public Schools. In 1917 he and Jeremiah E. Burke argued for the creation of junior high schools in Boston. Later that year he was promoted to assistant superintendent.

Ballou became superintendent of Washington, D.C. public schools in 1920. During this time, he oversaw the building of sixty new schools and raised teachers salaries.

Death and legacy 
Ballou died in 1955 in Washington, D.C. He is buried in Cedar Hill Cemetery in Prince George's County, Maryland.

Frank W. Ballou High School in Southeast, Washington, D.C. is named in his honor.

External links 
 The Appointment of Teachers in Cities By Frank Washington Ballou

References 

1879 births
1955 deaths
Harvard University alumni
People from St. Lawrence County, New York
Superintendents of District of Columbia Public Schools
Teachers College, Columbia University alumni